Under the Leather Helmet (French: Sous le casque de cuir) is a 1932 British-French drama film directed by Albert de Courville and starring Pierre Richard-Willm, Gina Manès and Gaston Modot. The film's sets were designed by the art director Pierre Schild.

Cast
 Pierre Richard-Willm as Le capitaine Sourvian  
 Gina Manès as Florica Romanescu  
 Gaston Modot as Le capitaine Simianoff  
 Marie Barge as Helena  
 Pierre Nay as Le Lt. des Roseaux  
 Raymond Destac as Sudek  
 Max Lerel as Reynier  
 George Rigaud as Le Lt. Beaufort  
 Petitjean as Le Lt. Vintilla  
 Henri Lévêque as Le Lt. Stream 
 De Kerstrat as Le Col. Philipesti 
 Dubreuil as Le Lt. Pola Vaccis  
 René Donnio

References

Bibliography 
 Crisp, Colin. Genre, Myth and Convention in the French Cinema, 1929-1939. Indiana University Press, 2002.

External links 
 

1932 films
1932 drama films
British drama films
French drama films
1930s French-language films
Films directed by Albert de Courville
French black-and-white films
British black-and-white films
1930s British films
1930s French films